Silvio Zogaj (born 25 July 1997) is an Albanian professional footballer who plays as a midfielder for Albanian club Kastrioti.

Career statistics

Club

References

External links
Silvio Zogaj profile FSHF.org

1997 births
Living people
People from Lezhë
Association football midfielders
Albanian footballers
Albania under-21 international footballers
Luftëtari Gjirokastër players
KF Laçi players
KF Vllaznia Shkodër players
Kategoria Superiore players
Kategoria e Parë players